St. Edmund's School, in Malviya Nagar, Jaipur, Rajasthan, India, was founded in 1986 and is one of the oldest schools in Jaipur.

History
St. Edmund's School is a co-educational school affiliated by the Central Board of Secondary Education. It was founded in July 1986, by Late Shri Ranveer Singh ji,

Academic life
The school follows flexible modular scheduling. The school practices a six-day week consisting of 40 periods, each of 35 minutes. The academic year consists of two terms, Spring and Autumn.

Social work, known formally as "Socially Useful Productive Work", is also part of school life.

School activities

Clubs and societies
Extracurricular activities are a compulsory element of school life.

School songs
Attendance at the morning assembly is required of all pupils and teachers. It traditionally begins with a song from the school's Song Book
 Song No. 1 – "Jana Gana Mana" by Rabindranath Tagore

References

External links
 

Schools in Jaipur
Educational institutions established in 1986
1986 establishments in Rajasthan